The Battle of Guayacanas was fought on 3 July 1916 between Dominican rebels and the United States during the United States occupation of the Dominican Republic. The Dominicans dug trenches on two hills blocking passage to Santiago and kept up single-shot fire against the automatic weapons of the Americans  before the Americans drove them off. Joseph A. Glowin, a corporal, was awarded the Medal of Honor for his bravery during the action.

Background
Triggered by concerns about possible German use of the Dominican Republic as a base for attacks on the United States during World War I, the US Government began a military occupation and administration of that country in 1916. Poorly armed Dominican rebels tried to take on the US Marines occupying the Dominican Republic in conventional battles. The first battle occurred at "Las Trincheras" (the trenches), a defensive position that the Dominicans called "Verdun." The Marines used field artillery to bomb the trenches, machine guns positioned behind the troops to suppress the rifle fire of the rebels, and then quick bayonet rushes to rout the rebels from the trenches. The Marines sustained five dead. They found no dead or weapons in the trenches but later discovered five rebel bodies in the nearby woods.

Battle
The Americans marched on Santiago City, a hotbed for the resistance. Colonel Pendelton's unit came under fire from Dominican soldiers and battle began. However, the Americans advancing on the Dominican positions did not record any injuries during the initial action. To aid the US Marines under fire, Cpl. Glowin fired his machine-gun and was only pulled out of battle when forced to, a brave action that decorated him with the USA's greatest military award the Medal of Honor. After his evacuation, Sergeant Roswell Winans brought up more machine-gun positions to fight off the enemy. This gave the Dominicans more targets to fire at. The captain in charge of the pit was killed and the others wounded. Winans was awarded a  medal as well, for firing a Colt machine-gun at the enemy even when it was jammed. Soon, two more gun positions were formed and the Dominicans fled. The 27th and 29th divisions gave chase and killed the enemy commander, routing the Dominican rebels.

See also
Santo Domingo Affair
Battle of San Francisco de Macoris

References

Bibliography

Banana Wars
Battles involving the Dominican Republic
United States Marine Corps in the 20th century
20th century in the Dominican Republic
Conflicts in 1916
Dominican Republic–United States military relations
Military history of the Dominican Republic
1916 in the Dominican Republic
Santiago de los Caballeros
July 1916 events
Battles and operations of the United States occupation of the Dominican Republic (1903–1924)